Oscoda may refer to:

 Oscoda, Michigan, an unincorporated community in Iosco County
 Oscoda County, Michigan
 Oscoda Township, Michigan, in Iosco County

Henry Schoolcraft neologisms